Bob Valvano (born January 29, 1957) is a former college basketball coach and an American sportscaster based in Louisville, Kentucky.

Television and coaching
During the college-basketball season, he is the lead game analyst for ESPNRadio, and occasionally for ESPNU. When not doing those games, Valvano is the color analyst for University of Louisville men's basketball games on radio (WHAS 840 and WKRD 790.)

Valvano began his coaching career at Hofstra University where he was an assistant to head coach Dick Berg for three years. Then he took over the head coaching position at Division II Kutztown. Valvano coached there for two years, setting the single-season record for wins his second year, before taking the head coaching position at St. Francis College in 1984. At the time of Valvano's hiring he was the youngest head coach in Division I men's basketball at 27 years old. While with the Terriers, Valvano did not have a winning season but did win the College's first postseason game in over 30 years in 1988.

In 1988, he left for Sweden to coach the Alvik Professional Basketball Club. After one year in Sweden, he returned to take the head coaching position at Division III Catholic University, where his third team there had the first 20-win season in school history, (20–6), and set 6 NCAA records for 3-point shooting.

Valvano then went to St. Mary's (MD), where his team had that school's first winning season ever at the NCAA level in 1994.

In 1994, Valvano took the head coaching job at Bellarmine University, where his teams improved for four straight years, culminating in back-to-back winning seasons (16–11, 17–10) his last two seasons.

Head coaching record

Radio
Valvano hosts a daily radio show (The V Show) on ESPN680 in Louisville from noon until 3 weekdays.

He had hosted a late night show on ESPN Radio (under the same V Show moniker) for over twelve years. During that time, SI's Richard Deitsch named Valvano his National Sportsradio Voice of the Year in 2012.

Valvano was also named Kentucky Sportscaster of the Year in 2016.

A regular segment on The V Show was the "Zero-Thousand-Dollar Pyramid," which was inspired by the Pyramid series of game shows. His show also regularly featured the "Sports Radio Match Game", based upon the 1970s edition of Match Game, complete with audio from that show.

Personal life
Valvano graduated cum laude from Virginia Wesleyan College in 1979, where he majored in communications and lettered in soccer, basketball and golf. (He was voted All-Conference First team as a goalkeeper and still holds the career record for saves at VWC.) He was inducted into the College's Sports Hall of Fame in its inaugural class in 2009.  He and his wife Darlene have two sons, Nicholas and Jamison.

Valvano is the younger brother of the late North Carolina State college basketball coach and TV commentator Jim Valvano. He is active in the V Foundation, Jim Valvano's legacy in the fight against cancer, and authored a book about his brother titled "The Gifts of Jimmy V".

References

1957 births
Living people
American men's basketball players
American people of Italian descent
American sports radio personalities
Association football goalkeepers
Basketball coaches from New York (state)
Basketball players from New York (state)
Bellarmine Knights men's basketball coaches
Catholic University Cardinals men's basketball coaches
College basketball announcers in the United States
Kutztown Golden Bears men's basketball coaches
Soccer players from New York (state)
St. Francis Brooklyn Terriers men's basketball coaches
St. Mary's Seahawks men's basketball coaches
Virginia Wesleyan Marlins men's basketball players
Virginia Wesleyan Marlins men's golfers
Virginia Wesleyan Marlins men's soccer players
Association football players not categorized by nationality